Lieutenant Commander Hamish Ian Mackintosh,  (born 26 July 1940; disappeared 7 July 1979) was a British Royal Navy officer, a writer of thriller novels, and a screenwriter for British television.

Early life, education and family
Born to Annie (née Lawrie) and James Mackintosh, Mackintosh was born in Inverness and raised primarily in Tain, a small town in the Scottish Highlands. His mother was a governess and his father was a naval officer. Educated at Inverness Royal Academy, Mackintosh initially applied to join the Fleet Air Arm as a pilot but was rejected due to poor eyesight. A subsequent application to join the Royal Air Force was also rejected for the same reason. After spending an additional year at school, Mackintosh applied for entry to Britannia Royal Naval College in 1958 to train as a Royal Navy officer and was accepted. In September 1969, he married Sharron Carter, daughter of a Royal Navy officer, and they had two daughters. Mackintosh and Carter subsequently divorced.

Career
Mackintosh's first novel, A Slaying in September, was published in 1967. He wrote four other original novels between 1967 and 1970; his later books were either based on his television series, or were novelizations of televised episodes of his television series.

Whilst serving as a Royal Navy officer, Mackintosh co-created the popular and acclaimed BBC television drama series Warship (1973–1977) and wrote several of its episodes. It was set on board the fictional HMS Hero (F42), which was portrayed by the real Leander-class frigate . Mackintosh was appointed a Member of the Order of the British Empire in the 1976 Birthday Honours on his retirement from the Royal Navy.

Employed at Yorkshire Television as a screenwriter after Warship, Mackintosh created and wrote most of the episodes of Wilde Alliance, Thundercloud, and The Sandbaggers.

Disappearance
On the evening of 7 July 1979, Mackintosh was flying with two others (his friend and an experienced British Airways captain Graham Barber, who was the pilot; and Mackintosh's girlfriend, Susan Insole) over the Gulf of Alaska in a light aircraft. The plane sent out a distress signal, which was picked up by the United States Coast Guard. The plane's last-known position was searched, but no wreckage of the plane was ever found, and its passengers have not been heard from since.

Bibliography 
 Mackintosh, Ian. (1978). The Sandbaggers. Corgi Children's.

See also 
List of people who disappeared mysteriously at sea

References

1940 births
1970s missing person cases
Members of the Order of the British Empire
Missing aviators
Missing air passengers
Missing person cases in Alaska
People declared dead in absentia
Military personnel from Inverness
Royal Navy officers
Scottish sailors
Scottish screenwriters
Scottish thriller writers
Victims of aviation accidents or incidents in 1979
Victims of aviation accidents or incidents in the United States